"All Night" is a song by British band The Vamps and Norwegian DJ Matoma, released on 14 October 2016. The Vamps released a preview of the song on 12 October 2016. It was later added to the BBC Radio 1 A-list. It serves as the first single from their third studio album Night & Day, being included on the first part of it, called Night Edition. It is also their first Platinum-certified release in the UK. It was later included on Matoma's second album, One in a Million (2018).

Background
"All Night" is an EDM song written by the Vamps, Justin Franks, Danny Majic and John Mitchell and produced by DJ Frank E, Danny Majic, and Matoma. In an interview for 1883 Magazine, guitarist James McVey said: "It's a song that we did with a guy called Frank E who’s a producer in LA and it was created on two trips there. First of all, he sent the idea of the chorus, and it sounds like it’s being sung by children but it’s pitched up so it’s like that kind of sample almost. Then Brad and I went for the first trip, we did some verses and then Connor went later with Brad. Tristan’s been working on it, helping and advising production-wise because he does production, so, it's a song that’s been happening over the past few months. It started really with that chorus and we wrote around it". Lyrically, "It's about a nostalgia, not like you've split up with someone but when you're apart you're thinking about them. In the verses, it also subtly hints at the fact that the person has helped you become a better person and helped you in difficult times", he explained.

The announcement of the release date of the song was made on 7 October 2016, through Capital FM.

The song was previously released on Capital FM on 13 October 2016 and officially released the next day. On 16 October 2016, it was announced that the bundle of the single would be released on 4 November 2016, containing two CDs and a digital download.

Track listing
Digital download – single
 "All Night" – 3:17
 "All Night" (featuring Astrid S) – 3:16

Digital download – acoustic version
 "All Night" (acoustic) – 3:03

Digital download – Remix
 "All Night" (Alex Adair Remix) – 3:33

Digital download – Live
 "All Night" (live from the Teen Awards)

CD1
 "All Night" – 3:17
 "Scars" – 3:46
 "Hideaway" – 3:04
 "Cheater" (live from the O2 Arena)

CD2
 "All Night" (acoustic version) – 3:03
 "Talk Show" – 3:04

Charts

Weekly charts

Year-end charts

Certifications

References 

2016 singles
2016 songs
The Vamps (British band) songs
Mercury Records singles
Virgin EMI Records singles
Songs written by DJ Frank E
Tropical house songs